Skellefteå IBK  is a floorball club in Skellefteå, Sweden, established 1985. The men's team played six seasons in the Swedish top division, starting with the 1989–1990 season.

References

External links
official website

1985 establishments in Sweden
Sport in Skellefteå
Sports clubs established in 1985
Swedish floorball teams